Joseph Parker (born 9-21-1978) is an American athlete who, at the age of 17, won two Gold medals and broke 2 World records in the Men's 800m and 5000m events in the 1996 Summer Paralympics held in Atlanta, Georgia.

References

Living people
Paralympic gold medalists for the United States
Athletes (track and field) at the 1996 Summer Paralympics
1978 births
Paralympic medalists in athletics (track and field)
Medalists at the 1996 Summer Paralympics
Paralympic track and field athletes of the United States